Raura (possibly from Quechua rawra gravel) is a mountain range located in the Andes of Peru, on the boundaries of the regions of Huánuco, Lima and Pasco. It extends between 10°21' and 10°31'S and 76°41' and 76°50'W for about 20 km. It lies a few kilometres southeast of Huayhuash mountain range.

Mountains 
Other mountains are listed below:

 Santa Rosa 
 Cule,  
 Flor de Luto,  
 León Huaccanan, 
 Condorsenja,  
 Quesillojanca,  
 Puyhuanccocha, 
 Chuspe, 
 Chacraccocha, 
 Chuspiccocha 
 Cushuropata, 
 Siete Caballeros, 
 Sillasura 
 Yanajirca,

Lakes 
Some of the largest lakes of the range are Patarcocha, Tinquicocha and Huascacocha.

Glaciers 
Notable glaciated areas in this range are: Leon Huaccanan-Azuljanka, which is a plateau of 10 km. long and 2½ km. wide that rises eastward, to a steep cliff in its eastern margin; a tiny ice plateau at the union of the Yarupac-Torre de Cristal ridges; and finally mount Santa Rosa which has the most of the remaining glacier ice. Permanent snow begins at about 5000m in the northern and central parts of  the range.

Environmental issues 
This mountain range has a bad conservation status because of mining activity in the area and the ongoing glacier retreat due to climate change. Explosions and pollution of lakes are important disturbances to the local ecosystem caused by mining activity. There are also abandoned facilities of other mining companies in the area.

References

Mountain ranges of Peru
Mountain ranges of Huánuco Region
Mountain ranges of Lima Region
Mountain ranges of Pasco Region